The Book Quiz is a BBC Four quiz programme. The first series, first broadcast in 2007, was hosted by David Baddiel with a second 2008 series hosted by Kirsty Wark.

Critical reception
Rupert Christiansen, writing for The Daily Telegraph, offered The Book Quiz as an example of the BBC's "dumbed-down arts coverage", calling it "breezy drivel" that does "little more than twitter." Alex Larman's review on guardian.co.uk said it was "hard to think of a more misconceived programme", "a very poor thing indeed" that seems to be "designed for, and by, people who don't read books."

Guest appearances

References

External links
 
 
 

2000s British game shows
2007 British television series debuts
2009 British television series endings
BBC television game shows
BBC panel games
British panel games
English-language television shows